Przemysław Wiśniewski (born 27 July 1998) is a Polish professional footballer who plays as a centre-back for Italian  club Spezia.

Club career
Wiśniewski comes from the Górnik Zabrze youth ranks.

On 27 May 2022, Wiśniewski signed a contract with Serie B club Venezia in Italy for three seasons with an option for a fourth.

On 26 January 2023, Wiśniewski moved to Spezia in Serie A on a four-and-a-half-year contract.

Career statistics

References

Polish footballers
1998 births
Sportspeople from Zabrze
Living people
Poland youth international footballers
Poland under-21 international footballers
Górnik Zabrze players
Venezia F.C. players
Spezia Calcio players
Association football defenders
Ekstraklasa players
III liga players
Serie B players
Polish expatriate footballers
Expatriate footballers in Italy
Polish expatriate sportspeople in Italy